Alocasia longiloba is a species of flowering plant in the family Araceae. It is the namesake of a species complex. The complex has a widespread distribution; Guangdong, Hainan, and southern Yunnan in China, mainland Southeast Asia, and western and central Malesia. 

In the houseplant trade, many of the former species that were subsumed into Alocasia longiloba are now considered types or varieties, these include 'argyrea', 'korthalsii', 'lowii', and 'watsoniana'. The placement and validity of such varieties, and of any potential hybrids and cultivars within the complex is unclear, including 'Jackrabbit' and 'Thibautians'. Similarly, a cross of Alocasia lowii with the kris plant Alocasia sanderiana produced Alocasia ×mortfontanensis, which may or may not be the same as the well-known hybrid Alocasia ×amazonica, the African mask, formed by crossing A.sanderiana and Alocasia watsoniana, with the only certain parent in either cross being A.sanderiana.

References

longiloba
House plants
Flora of Yunnan
Flora of Guangdong
Flora of Hainan
Flora of Indo-China
Flora of Peninsular Malaysia
Flora of Singapore
Flora of Sumatra
Flora of Java
Flora of the Lesser Sunda Islands
Flora of Borneo
Flora of Sulawesi
Plants described in 1856